Weyerhaeuser Glacier is a large glacier flowing north into Mercator Ice Piedmont close west of Mobiloil Inlet, on the east coast of Antarctic Peninsula. This glacier lies in the area first explored from the air by Sir Hubert Wilkins in 1928 and Lincoln Ellsworth in 1935, but it was first clearly delineated in aerial photographs taken by the United States Antarctic Service (USAS) in 1940. The glacier was resighted in 1947 by the Ronne Antarctic Research Expedition (RARE) under Ronne. He named it for F. K. Weyerhaeuser, of the Weyerhaeuser Timber Co., who contributed lumber and insulating material to the expedition.

See also
Mount McAllister, rising to 1,975 metres (6,480 ft) on the west side of Weyerhaeuser Glacier

References

External links

Glaciers of Graham Land
Bowman Coast
Weyerhaeuser